Anthodioctes is a genus of bee in the family Megachilidae.

Species 
The following species are accepted within Anthodioctes:

 Anthodioctes affinis Urban, 2003
 Anthodioctes agnatus  (Cresson, 1878) 
 Anthodioctes analuizae (Urban, 1998) 
 Anthodioctes angelicae Urban, 1999 
 Anthodioctes argentinus Urban, 1999 
 Anthodioctes ayalai Urban, 2002 
 Anthodioctes banksi (Cockerell, 1928) 
 Anthodioctes bettyae (Moure, 1947) 
 Anthodioctes calcaratus (Friese, 1921) 
 Anthodioctes callorhinus (Cockerell, 1927) 
 Anthodioctes camargoi Urban, 1999 
 Anthodioctes cerradicola Urban, 1999 
 Anthodioctes chiribogae Urban, 1999 
 Anthodioctes chrysurus (Cockerell, 1927) 
 Anthodioctes claudii Urban, 1999 
 Anthodioctes costaricensis Urban, 1999 
 Anthodioctes fasciatus (Urban, 2007) 
 Anthodioctes flavoalveolatus (Urban, 2007) 
 Anthodioctes foersteri (Urban, 1998) 
 Anthodioctes gracilis Urban, 1999 
 Anthodioctes gualanensis (Cockerell, 1912) 
 Anthodioctes guiomardi Urban, 2003 
 Anthodioctes holmbergi (Cockerell, 1927) 
 Anthodioctes indescriptus  (Dalla Torre, 1890) 
 Anthodioctes langei Urban, 1999 
 Anthodioctes lauroi (Moure, 1947) 
 Anthodioctes lourdes Urban, 1999 
 Anthodioctes lunatus  (Smith, 1854) 
 Anthodioctes manauara Urban, 1999 
 Anthodioctes manni (Cockerell, 1927) 
 Anthodioctes mapirensis (Cockerell, 1927) 
 Anthodioctes megachiloides Holmberg, 1903 
 Anthodioctes meridionalis Urban, 1999 
 Anthodioctes misiutae Urban, 2002 
 Anthodioctes moratoi Urban, 1999 
 Anthodioctes navarroi Urban, 1999 
 Anthodioctes nitidipes (Cockerell, 1927) 
 Anthodioctes panamensis (Urban, 1998) 
 Anthodioctes peruvianus (Urban, 2007) 
 Anthodioctes psaenythioides Holmberg, 1903 
 Anthodioctes quadrimaculatus (Cockerell, 1927) 
 Anthodioctes radialis  (Ducke, 1908) 
 Anthodioctes rosanae Urban, 2002 
 Anthodioctes salti  (Schwarz, 1933) 
 Anthodioctes salvatoris Urban, 1999 
 Anthodioctes sanmartinensis Urban, 2004 
 Anthodioctes santosi Urban, 1999 
 Anthodioctes schlindweini (Urban, 2007) 
 Anthodioctes shilcayensis Urban, 2004 
 Anthodioctes sioneii Urban, 1999 
 Anthodioctes speciosus Urban, 1999 
 Anthodioctes undecimalis (Cockerell, 1927) 
 Anthodioctes vernoniae  (Schrottky, 1911) 
 Anthodioctes vilhenae Urban, 1999 
 Anthodioctes willineri (Moure, 1947) 
 Anthodioctes xilitlae Urban, 1999
 Anthodioctes zebratus  (Schrottky, 1908)

References

Megachilidae
Insects described in 1903